Salsa Americana, also known as simply Americana, is a Chilean sauce made from a finely chopped or blended mixture of pickles, pickled carrots and pickled onions. One typically finds this condiment used on a traditional completo along with tomato, sauerkraut (chucrut) and mayonnaise. For this reason, the Salsa Americana is widely associated with Chilean completo culture.

See also

 Chilean Cuisine
 List of sauces

References

External links
 https://www.enmicocinahoy.cl/salsa-americana-receta-chilena-chilean-american-salsa/

Chilean sauces